Worth It is an American entertainment web series by BuzzFeed that premiered on September 18, 2016. Posted to Hulu and YouTube, each episode of the series compares three different food dishes from three locations that are sold at low, medium, and high price points.

Premise and production 
Each episode sees presenters Steven Lim and Andrew Ilnyckyj, along with cameraman Adam Bianchi, visiting three different restaurants to try similar foods at three "drastically different price points"—affordable, mid, and luxury. The three are invariably positive about the food that they eat, a differentiating factor from BuzzFeed's other video content.

The series airs on Hulu and YouTube and episodes have frequently been featured at the top of those sites' "trending" videos—both factors that have allowed the series to garner a global audience.

Impact 
Worth It won the 2017 and 2018 Streamy Award for best online food show. As of October 2017, the series had been viewed more than 300 million times for a total of over 2 billion minutes; in 2018 alone, viewers watched 1.5 billion minutes on the show. "When we watch the pair appraise a $1 coffee versus a $914 coffee in Tokyo," Candice Chung of Australia's Special Broadcasting Service writes, "we are watching the reaction of 'food civilians' who would marvel as we would at the heart-stopping price difference at a drink so humble and quotidian." The show's popularity has led to it being described by BuzzFeed as a Zagat guide for millennials, and has created extreme upticks in patronage for some restaurants featured on the show.

The success of Worth It influenced Buzzfeed's decision to launch a new reviews section in 2018.

Episodes

Spin-offs 
A spin-off series, Worth It: Lifestyle, was first aired in January 2017 on BuzzFeedBlue, featuring Lim as host and a variety of BuzzFeed employees as co-hosts. The spin-off has the same premise as the original series, except that the hosts try three different experiences and items as opposed to only food.

Two international spin-offs of Worth It have been produced: Worth It UK, hosted by Richard Alan Reid with various alternating hosts and Joseph Bor as the "sound guy" (Bor also co-hosted the fish and chips episode of the series); and a pilot episode for BuzzFeed India, hosted by Akash Iyer and Arshad Wahid with Aishwarya Katkade as the "sound guy." Andrew Ilnyckyj appears in two episodes of the UK spin-off.

Notes

References

External links 
Facebook page
Instagram
YouTube playlist

2016 web series debuts
American non-fiction web series
BuzzFeed
YouTube original programming